The 7th Annual Premios Juventud (Youth Awards) were broadcast by Univision on July 15, 2010.

Performers

Presenters

 Anahí
 Víctor Manuelle
 María Fernanda Yépez
 Fedro
 Dulce María
 Amelia Vega
 Marlon Moreno
 Eugenio Siller
 Blanca Soto
 Andrea Gómez
 Michel Brown
 María Elena Salinas
 Belinda
 Jacqueline Bracamontes
 Selena Gomez
 Joey King

 Ivy Queen
 Juanes
 Diego Torres
 William Levy
 Noel Schajris
 Guy Ecker
 Dyland & Lenny
 Amado Guevara
 Alfonso de Anda
 Scarlet Ortiz
 Wilmer Valderrama
 Ana Patricia González
 Sebastián Zurita
 Rodner Figueroa

Special awards

Supernova Award
 Shakira

Idol of Generations Award
 Juan Luis Guerra

The Best Dressed Award
 Belinda (Felmale)
 Pitbull (Male)

Winners and nominees
Bold denotes winner not revealed during the ceremony.

Music

Fashion and Images

Movies

Pop Culture

Sports

References

Premios Juventud
Premios Juventud
Premios Juventud
Premios Juventud
Premios Juventud
Premios Juventud
Premios Juventud
2010s in Miami